Saururus cernuus (lizard's tail, water-dragon, dragon's tail, swamp root) is a medicinal and ornamental plant native to eastern North America.  It grows in wet areas or shallow water, and can be up to about a meter tall. The native range covers much of the eastern United States, as far west as eastern Texas and Kansas, south to Florida, and north to Michigan and New York state. Saururus cernuus also occurs in Ontario Canada. It is an obligate wetland plant and able to grow in saturated soils.

Saururus cernuus is a herbaceous perennial that gets its most frequent common name, lizard's tail, from its white flowers that bloom in the summer months. The inflorescence is usually 6 to 8 in long. After floral maturity the white flowers turn brown, giving the plant its namesake, lizard's tail. The leaves are usually heart-shaped, arrow-shaped, or lance-shaped, and are arranged alternately on the stem. When the leaves are crushed they release a citrus or sassafras aroma.

As an aquatic plant, S. cernuus is an important food source for many wetland animals, including beavers. In an exclusion study beavers reduced the prevalence of S. cernuus by 45%.

Its medicinal properties have been used to treat swelling in the body. Cherokee and Chocktaw native Americans mashed up S. cernuus roots as a poultice, and applied the plant to soothe inflammation of the breasts and back. The Seminoles used the plant as an antirheumatic, as well as a way to soothe fevers and body aches.

Description 
Saururus cernuus is a wetland plant that commonly grows to 2 to 3 ft in height. It is herbaceous and can be distinctively identified during the flowering season. Flowering occurs during the summer months, May to early August, blossoming with small white flowers composing a spike inflorescence 3-6 in long. Flowers are simple, and have 6 or fewer stamens and 3 or fewer carpels. Due to formation of dense rhizomes, lizard's tail can be very competitive for below-ground resources. Leaves are heart-shaped (cordate) and alternate along the stem of the plant.

Synonyms include Saururus cernuus f. submersus Glück.

Distribution and habitat 
Saururus cernuus L. is distributed throughout Southeastern United States, normally within marshes, along the edges of streams or lakes. The  Range includes the mid-Atlantic states to Florida. Lizards tails are found in freshwater wetlands, normally submerged in shallow water. Saururus cernuus can thrive in saturated soil, and can also tolerate shading by larger trees. Rhizomes are abundantly present within this species, reaching lengths up to 3 meters. Their rhizomes spread laterally below the soil. These rhizomes are characterized with a linear series of nodes that follow along the tip of the rhizomes. Seeds are dispersed in autumn, and are light green, then turn brown.

Uses 
Saururus cernuus have been used to restore and create wetlands. Native plant nurseries sell rhizomes for wetland restoration. Native Americans and early settlers used lizards tail for their medicinal properties. Lizard's tail rhizomes were ground and used as a sedative, to treat swelling and inflammation, and to lower fevers.

Conservation status 
Lizards tail are abundantly present throughout the United States. In fact, this plant can potentially outcompete other species of plants   Saururus cernuus form lengthy rhizomes that can out compete within their herbaceous layer.

Etymology 
The genus name Saururus is from the greek word, sauros meaning "lizard" and oura meaning "tail". The species name "cernuus" is Latin and refers to the plant's drooping and distinctive inflorescence.

Interactions with beetles 
Studies show a possible connection with longhorn beetles and S. cernuus. Mating of three different species of longhorn beetles have been observed in association with S. cernuus: Strangalia luteicornis, Typocerus lugubris, and Typocerus velutinus velutinus. Moreover, 29 other species of beetles have been observed on S. cernuus. Flowers and fruits of S. cernuus are a likely food source for many beetles.

Interactions with beavers 
Herbivores such as the North American beaver (Castor canadensis) have had a strong impact on aquatic plants. Beavers often chose this lizard's tail plant rather than other plants that may thrive within the area. Studies show that in areas where beavers are present, lizard's tail are less likely to be observed.

References

External links
Saururus cernuus

Saururaceae
Flora of Eastern North America
Medicinal plants
Plants described in 1753
Taxa named by Carl Linnaeus